Paraburkholderia eburnea is a Gram-negative, aerobic, non-spore-forming bacterium from the genus Paraburkholderia and the family Burkholderiaceae which was isolated from peat soil.

References

eburnea
Bacteria described in 2014